"Miracle Drug" is a song by Irish rock band U2, and is the second track on their 2004 album How to Dismantle an Atomic Bomb. The song's lyrics were written by lead vocalist Bono about a former schoolmate Christopher Nolan, who was paralysed from birth but through a medical breakthrough learned to communicate via a pointer attached to his forehead and eventually wrote several books.

Composition
"Miracle Drug" was written about the late Irish writer Christopher Nolan, with whom the band attended Mount Temple Comprehensive School. Bono said of Nolan:

Live performances
"Miracle Drug" was played live at every show of the first and second legs of the Vertigo Tour, with Bono using the song (and the story of Nolan) as a means of expressing his appreciation for doctors, nurses, and others in the medical field. Its last performance on the Vertigo Tour was 28 November 2005 in Montreal.

The song made a brief return to the live stage in a new, reworked format on the first leg of U2's Innocence + Experience Tour. It opened the first encore in what was meant to be a rotational spot with "City of Blinding Lights".

References

U2 songs
2004 songs
Song recordings produced by Jacknife Lee
Songs written by Bono
Songs written by the Edge
Songs written by Adam Clayton
Songs written by Larry Mullen Jr.
Song recordings produced by Steve Lillywhite